The 1980–81 season saw Partick Thistle compete in the Scottish Premier Division, the top tier of Scottish football, where they finished 6th on 30 points. They also competed in the Scottish Cup, where they were eliminated in the fourth round, and the Scottish League Cup, where they were eliminated in the quarter-finals.

Season summary
After Bertie Auld left to manage Hibernian in November 1980, Peter Cormack was appointed as manager on 5 December 1980.

They finished 6th on 30 points.

Competitions

Scottish Premier Division

League table

Matches

Source:

Scottish Cup

Source:

Scottish League Cup

Source:

Notes

References

Partick Thistle F.C. seasons
Partick Thistle